Speech is the fourth and final album of the British band Steamhammer.

In 1971, bassist Steve Davy left the band, and Louis Cennamo was recruited as his replacement - then, vocalist/guitarist Kieran White also left after a summer tour. Guitarist Martin Pugh, drummer Mick Bradley and Cennamo (with guest vocalist Garth Watt-Roy, of Fuzzy Duck) then went in the studio to record Speech, which was released in 1972. It consisted of three lengthy (and mostly instrumental) songs in a heavier progressive-rock vein, that was somewhat different from their initial blues and folk/jazz-influenced albums.

Bradley died from leukemia shortly before the album's mixing was completed (the album is dedicated to him on the inside album cover). The band continued with American singer/guitarist Bruce Payne and drummer John Lingwood, touring in Germany in support of the album, where they were more popular than back home in England.

After Steamhammer wound down, Pugh and Cennamo joined up with former Yardbirds vocalist Keith Relf (who had provided production assistance on Speech, as well as contributing background vocals) and drummer Bobby Caldwell, formerly of Johnny Winter's band and Captain Beyond, to form Armageddon.

Track listing

Personnel

 Martin Pugh - guitar, vocals
 Louis Cennamo - bass, bowed bass, vocals
 Mick Bradley - percussion
 Garth Watt-Roy - lead vocals

Technical
 Keith Relf - backing vocals, production assistance
Pete Booth - engineer
Paul Whitehead - cover art

Product details 

 Audio CD (1991)
 Original release date: 1972
 Number of discs: 1
 Format: Import
 Label: Repertoire (CD reissue)
 ASIN: B00000743R

Also:
 Audio CD (October 11, 2005)
 Original release date: 1972
 Number of discs: 1
 Label: Akarma Italy
 ASIN: B00009Y34Y

References

External links
 Keith Relf website
 Steamhammer's "Speech" review

Steamhammer (band) albums
1972 albums
Columbia Records albums